The administrator of the Government of Canada is the title used by the individual performing the duties of Governor General of Canada – the federal viceregal representative – while the office is vacant or its incumbent is otherwise unable to perform his or her duties. The office is defined in the Letters Patent, 1947, which created the office of Governor General in its present-day role. Should it be necessary to fill the position, the chief justice of Canada may act as the administrator, followed by the puisne justices in order of seniority should the chief justice not be able to assume the role. Accordingly, the role is a temporary one meant to serve only during a vacancy in the governor general's office, and is not a title that is consistently held by the chief justice at all times.

The administrator of Canada represents the Crown in right of the federal government. The office of administrator may also exist in a provincial context, when a lieutenant governor is unable to perform their role representing the Crown in right of a province.

Designation 
The provisions to select the administrator of Canada is outlined in Article VIII of the Letters Patent, 1947, which identifies that the chief justice of Canada assumes the role as administrator should the need arise. In the absence of the chief justice, the senior puisne justice of the Supreme Court of Canada is designated as the administrator of the government. Prior to the Letters Patent, 1947, the administrator of the government was directly appointed by the monarch. An administrator of the government is not required if a governor general is absent for less than 30 days, with the governor general empowered to designate a "deputy governor general" to act on their behalf. Richard Wagner is the most recent person to be designated as the administrator of Canada.

The office is not automatically filled, as the designee must first take the oath of office.

Role 
The administrator of the government is empowered to exercise all of the powers of the governor general as representative of the Crown. These may include:

 giving royal assent to bills passed by the legislature;
 issuing Orders in Council and making Governor in Council (Administrator in Council) appointments;
 dissolving Parliament for a general election;
 summoning Parliament after a general election by way of a proclamation;
 choosing a prime minister to form government and seek the confidence of the House of Commons;
 opening each new session of Parliament by reading the Speech from the Throne;
 providing a recommendation for all spending measures initiated by the House of Commons; and
 appointing provincial lieutenant governors and various officers, including commissioners and diplomats.

Notable instances 
Lyman Duff served as administrator on two occasions. The first was in 1931, while Duff was still a puisne justice, between the departure of the Marquess of Willingdon for England on January 16, 1931, and the arrival of the Earl of Bessborough on April 4; in this context, on March 12 of that year he became the first Canadian-born person ever to read a Speech from the Throne to open a session of Parliament. After becoming chief justice in 1933, he served a second stint as administrator from February 11 to June 21, 1940, between the death of the Baron Tweedsmuir in office and the appointment of the Earl of Athlone.

On February 1, 1952, King George VI approved the appointment of Vincent Massey as the next governor general. The incumbent, Viscount Alexander of Tunis, then left Canada, with Thibaudeau Rinfret becoming administrator until Massey could be sworn in. The king died on February 6, so it was Rinfret who proclaimed Elizabeth II as Queen of Canada. Massey was sworn in on February 28.

Following Georges Vanier's death in office in March 1967, Robert Taschereau served as administrator for several weeks until the appointment of Roland Michener.

On June 8, 1974, Governor General Jules Léger suffered a stroke. Chief Justice Bora Laskin acted as administrator during that time for approximately six months. Laskin's tenure as administrator included:

 a six-day royal visit from the Queen Mother;
 the 30th federal general election;
 the swearing-in ceremony of the new Cabinet;
 the opening of the 30th Parliament and the delivery of the Speech from the Throne;
 bearing witness to the appointment of the speaker of the Senate;
 granting Royal Assent to a bill; and
 naming a deputy administrator.

Former chief justice Beverley McLachlin became the administrator for a few weeks in July 2005 when then-governor general Adrienne Clarkson was hospitalized. During that time, McLachlin gave royal assent to the Civil Marriage Act, which legalized same-sex marriages.

Richard Wagner was sworn in as administrator in January 2021 following the resignation of Julie Payette over workplace harassment allegations. He served as administrator until Mary Simon was sworn in as Canada's 30th Governor General on July 26, 2021.

Provincial administrators 
As each province has a lieutenant governor representing the Crown in right of a province, administrators can also be designated on a provincial level, performing all of the functions of the lieutenant governor in their absence.

If a lieutenant governor cannot act in their role, a Governor in Council appointment designates a provincial administrator. For example, the Governor in Council on the advice of the minister of Canadian heritage issued an Order in Council in 2017 that in the province of Ontario, the chief justice of Ontario and other judges of the courts of Ontario, in order of seniority, can act as the administrator of the Government of Ontario.

Unlike federal administrators, provincial administrators “die with the Lieutenant Governor” and cannot execute the viceregal office during a vacancy.

See also 
 List of administrators of the Government of Canada
 Administrator of the government
 Monarchy of Canada
 Prime Minister of Canada

References 

Administrators
Government of Canada
Viceroys in Canada